Crookstown may refer to:

 Crookstown, County Cork, Ireland
 Crookstown, County Kildare, Ireland

See also
 Crookston (disambiguation)